A penumbral lunar eclipse took place on Thursday, 18 August 2016. It was the second of three lunar eclipses in 2016. This was 3.7 days before the Moon reached perigee. There are multiple ways to determine the boundaries of Earth's shadow, so this was a miss according to some sources. The HM National Almanac Office's online canon of eclipses lists this event as the last eclipse on Saros Series 109, while NASA lists August 8, 1998 as the last eclipse of the series, and has this event missing the shadow.

Background 
The Earth's penumbral shadow is larger than would be expected from simple geometry, a phenomenon first observed by Philippe de La Hire in 1707. The precise amount of enlargement varies over time for reasons which are not fully understood, but likely involve the amount of dust in certain layers of the Earth's atmosphere. Various eclipse almanacs have used different assumptions about the magnitude of this effect, resulting in disagreement about the predicted duration of lunar eclipses or, in the case of penumbral eclipses of very short duration, whether the eclipse will occur at all.

In 1989, NASA published a lunar eclipse almanac that predicted a short penumbral lunar eclipse to occur on 18 August 2016. However, the French almanac Connaissance des Temps used more conservative assumptions about the size of the Earth's shadow and did not predict an eclipse to occur at all. The Bureau des Longitudes in France continued to refine their lunar eclipse models; NASA's 2009 edition of its lunar eclipse almanac was based on their values, which effectively reclassified nine eclipses between 1801 and 2300 as non-events, including the one in August 2016.

Some resources, including the HM Nautical Almanac Office's online canon of eclipses, continued to list the 18 August 2016 event. Despite not appearing in NASA's printed lists of eclipses since the 2009 revision, AccuWeather reported the upcoming eclipse and projected this was the final member of Lunar Saros 109.

Visibility 

This eclipse grazed the northern boundary of the Earth's penumbral shadow. The event lasted 33 minutes and 36 seconds, beginning at 9:25 UTC and ending at 9:59. This produced a maximum penumbral magnitude of 0.0166. Eclipses of such small magnitudes are visually imperceptible; a penumbral magnitude of approximately 0.6 is required for even skilled observers to detect.

Related eclipses

Eclipses of 2016 
 A total solar eclipse on 9 March.
 A penumbral lunar eclipse on 23 March.
 A penumbral lunar eclipse on 18 August.
 An annular solar eclipse on 1 September.
 A penumbral lunar eclipse on 16 September.

Two other penumbral lunar eclipses occurred in 2016, they were on 23 March and 16 September.

Lunar year series

Saros series 
According to some sources, this was the last lunar eclipse of Saros cycle 109, and was eclipse 72 in that series. There are many ways to determine the boundaries of Earth's shadow. One model was revised and this eclipse was classified a non-event by that model. Some eclipse sites decided to follow those calculations which meant Saros 109 now includes 71 events, with the last occurring on 8 August 1998.

See also 
 List of lunar eclipses 
 List of 21st-century lunar eclipses
October 2042 lunar eclipse
July 2027 lunar eclipse

Notes

References

Bibliography 
 
 

2016-08
2016 in science
August 2016 events